Our Lady often refers to:
 Mary, mother of Jesus
 Veneration of Mary in the Catholic Church

Our Lady may also refer to:

Titles of Mary

A number of specific Marian Apparitions, icons, titles, or Marian shrines such as:

See also the :Category:Titles of Mary.

Ancient and Medieval titles
Our Lady of Guadalupe, Extremadura, a Marian shrine in the medieval kingdom of Castile
Our Lady of Ljeviš, a 12th-century Serbian Orthodox Church cathedral in the town of Prizren, Kosovo
Our Lady of Mount Carmel, who appeared to St. Simon Stock in 1251
Our Lady of Nazaré, a Marian icon sculpted in wood, by St. Joseph according to the legend of Nazaré
Our Lady of Peñafrancia, a wooden statue of the Blessed Virgin Mary venerated in Naga City, Bicol, Philippines
Our Lady of Perpetual Help, associated with a celebrated Byzantine icon of the same name dating from the 15th century
Our Lady of Trsat, a 13th-century apparition to a Croat woodcutters near Trsat Castle, Rijeka, Croatia
Our Lady of Walsingham, an 11th-century apparition to a Saxon noblewoman in Norfolk.
Our Lady of Westminster, a 15th-century alabaster madonna venerated in Westminster Cathedral, London
Our Lady With The Poovan Bananas, a 13th-century apparition at Koratty, Kerala, India
Our Lady, Star of the Sea, a title of the Virgin Mary
Our Lady of Poland, a title of the Virgin Mary

Modern titles 
Our Lady of the Abandoned Parish Church (Marikina), a Roman Catholic church in Marikina, Philippines
Our Lady of Akita, an apparition in Yuzawadai, Akita Prefecture, Japan in 1973–1979.
Our Lady of Aparecida, the patron saint of Brazil, represented by a statue of the Virgin Mary located in the Basilica of Aparecida in Aparecida, São Paulo
Our Lady of Arabia, the patroness of the Arabian peninsula
Our Lady of Fatima, a title given to the Virgin Mary by Catholics and others who believe that she appeared to three shepherd children at Fátima, Portugal, in 1917
Our Lady of Ferguson, a 21st-century title and icon inspired by the Shooting of Michael Brown in 2014
Our Lady of the Good Event, a late-16th- to early-17th-century apparition in Quito, Ecuador
Our Lady of Good Voyage, a devotion that originated in Portugal and Spain
Our Lady of Guadalupe, a Roman Catholic icon and Mexico's most popular religious image
Our Lady of the Hens, the finding of a Marian icon and subsequent apparitions in Pagani, Campania
Our Lady of Knock, a Marian apparition in Knock-Aghamore, Éire, in 1879
Our Lady of La Salette, a Marian apparition that appeared in 1846 to two shepherd children in La Salette
Our Lady of Lebanon, a Marian shrine and a pilgrimage site in Harissa, Lebanon
Our Lady of Lourdes, a Marian apparition first seen in Lourdes, France, in 1858
Our Lady of Međugorje, a Marian apparition that appeared to Croat children in Međugorje, Herzegovina, in 1980
Our Lady of Palmar, a Marian apparition in El Palmar de Troya, Spain in the 1970s; rejected by the Catholic Church.
Our Lady of Providence, a title of Mary that originated with the Barnabites in 1664
Our Lady of Sinj (Gospa Sinjska), the patron saint of Sinj, Croatia
Our Lady of Šiluva, an icon of the Virgin Mary in Siluva, Lithuania
Our Lady of Vaillankanni, a title based on based on apparitions in the 16th–17th centuries in Velankanni, Tamil Nadu, India
Our Lady of Palestine, a Catholic monastery in central Israel
Our Lady of Charity, a Marian title and the Patroness of Cuba
Our Lady of the Rosary, a title of the Virgin Mary
Our Lady of Miracles, a Marian apparition in 1547 in Alcamo, Sicily
Our Lady of San Juan de los Lagos, a title of the Virgin Mary and a Roman Catholic church in Jalisco, Mexico

Music
"Our Lady", a song by Deep Purple from their 1973 album Who Do We Think We Are
A recurring theme on different albums by The Legendary Pink Dots (e.g. "Our Lady in Black", "Our Lady in Chambers")

Schools
 Our Lady of Mount Carmel Learning Center, a school in the Philippines
 Our Lady of Lourdes, a school and church in Bethesda, Maryland

See also 
Our Lady of Africa (disambiguation)
Our Lady of Mercy College (disambiguation)
Our Lady of the Rosary
Church of Our Lady (disambiguation)
Gospa (Our Lady), a 1995 Croatian/English-language film
Madonna (disambiguation), Italian/Latin (Ma donna) for "Our Lady"
Notre Dame (disambiguation), French for "Our Lady"